Pilima, also known as Pidima, is a Wayana village situated on the Litani River in French Guiana.

History 

Pilima was founded by the shaman or pïyai Pilima, son of former head captain Janomalë. Pilima sometimes clashed with the new head captain of Kawemhakan, Anapaikë, who according to Pilima pandered too much to the wishes of the Baptist missionaries. As a reaction to the missionary activities, Pilima started a prophetic movement that had the characteristics of a syncretic Christian cult: Pilima claimed to be in contact Aramawali, a great spirit from the heavens, who would send "heaven boats" from the sky to gather the Wayana who believed in him, and who would bring them to heaven where they would live an eternal life. In ceremonies, Pilima would imitate church rites and attempt to sing church songs. A central aspect of the cult was the jumping in the water from a springboard, in an apparent reference to Christian baptism, which according to Pilima would help the Wayana overcome their fears, which stood in the way of their salvation by Aramawali. The cult died out after a while, and Pilima and the village returned to their earlier lives.

Education 
A primary school opened in Pilima in 1997.

Geography 
Pilima is the southernmost of all Wayana villages currently inhabited on the Litani River.

Notes

References 

Indigenous villages in French Guiana
Maripasoula
Villages in French Guiana